Richard Davies (1915–1994) was an American actor.

Davies was born in Provo, Utah. His first films date from 1941, and he was active through the early 1960s, ranging from lead roles to small bit and character parts.

Filmography

 San Antonio Rose (1941) - Eddie
 Unfinished Business (1941) - Richard
 Road Agent (1941) - Tom Martin
 Don't Get Personal (1942) - John Stowe
 The Mad Doctor of Market Street (1942) - Jim
 Gang Busters (1942, serial) - Happy Haskins
 Private Buckaroo (1942)  - Lt. Howard Mason
 Top Sergeant (1942) - Phil
 Eagle Squadron (1942) - White, RAF pilot
 Give Out, Sisters (1942) - Kendall
 Strictly in the Groove (1942) - Bob Saunders
 Behind the Eight Ball (1942) - Clay Martin
 When Johnny Comes Marching Home (1942) - Lt. Tommy Bridges
 The Amazing Mrs. Holliday (1943) - Reporter (uncredited) (unbilled)
 Hi'ya, Chum (1943) - Worker (uncredited) (unbilled) 
 The Sky's the Limit (1943) - Richard Merlin (uncredited) (unbilled) 
 The Falcon in Danger (1943) - Kenneth Gibson
 The Seventh Victim (1943) - Detective (uncredited) (unbilled)
 The Iron Major (1943) - Chuck (uncredited) (unbilled)
 Christmas Holiday (1944) - Lieutenant (uncredited) (unbilled)
 Marine Raiders (1944) - Instructor (uncredited) (unbilled)
 Step Lively (1944) - Minor Role (uncredited) (unbilled)
 Swingin' on a Rainbow (1945) - Lieutenant (uncredited)
 Arson, Inc. (1949) - Junior Peyson
 The Party Crashers (1958) - Police Lieutenant (uncredited)
 Cimarron (1960) - Mr. Hodges (uncredited)
 The Couch (1960) - Doctor (uncredited)
 Married Too Young (1961) - Judge
 Wall of Noise (1963) - Paddock Judge (uncredited)
 Kisses for My President (1964) - Captain (uncredited) (final film role)

References

External links 
 

1915 births
1994 deaths
American male film actors
20th-century American male actors
People from Provo, Utah
Male actors from Utah
Place of death missing